Kawasaki station may refer to:

Kawasaki-juku, a Tōkaidō waystation in Kawasaki-ku, Kawasaki, Kanagawa, Japan
Kawasaki Station (a train station of JR East line in Kawasaki, Kanagawa, Japan
Shin-Kawasaki Station, Saiwai, Kawasaki, Kanagawa, Japan; a train station
Kawasaki-Daishi Station,  Kawasaki-ku, Kawasaki, Kanagawa Prefecture, Japan; a train station on the Keikyu Line
Keikyū Kawasaki Station (a train station on the Keikyuu Line in Kawasaki, Kanagawa, Japan
Hama-Kawasaki Station, a train station of JR East line in Kawasaki-ku, Kawasaki, Kanagawa, Japan
Kawasakishimmachi Station, a train station on the Nambu Branch Line in Kawasaki-ku, Kawasaki, Kanagawa, Japan
Kawasaki-Gashi Freight Terminal, Sawai, Kawasaki, Kanagawa, Japan; a freight rail line station of the JNR
Buzen-Kawasaki Station, a train station on the Hitahikosan Line of JR Kyuushu, in Kawasaki, Fukuoka, Japan